Leoš Friedl and Filip Polášek were the defending champions, but Polášek decided to participate in Gstaad instead.
As a result, Friedl played alongside David Škoch, but they were eliminated by Čilić and L Zovko in the quarterfinals.

Simone Bolelli and Fabio Fognini won the title, defeating Marin Čilić and Lovro Zovko 6–3, 5–7, [10–7] in the final.

Seeds

Draw

Draw

References
 Doubles Draw

ATP Studena Croatia Open - Doubles
2011 Doubles